William E. Sadowski (died April 9, 1992) was an American politician. He served as a Democratic member of the Florida House of Representatives. He represented the 113th district.

In 1976, Sadowski won the election for the 113th district. He succeeded Nancy Harrington. In 1982, Sadowski was succeeded by Humberto Cortina.

Sadowski died in April 1992 in a plane crash in St. Augustine, Florida. He died along with his pilot, Billy Martin, when Martin died from a heart attack while piloting.

References 

Year of birth missing
1992 deaths
20th-century American politicians
Accidental deaths in Florida
Democratic Party members of the Florida House of Representatives
Victims of aviation accidents or incidents in 1992
Victims of aviation accidents or incidents in the United States